Mahanayak is a Marathi historical novel on the life of Subhas Chandra Bose, written by prominent Marathi author Vishvas Patil. This novel is translated into many other Indian and foreign languages.

External links 
 

Cultural depictions of Subhas Chandra Bose
Indian historical novels
Biographical novels
Marathi-language literature
Novels by Vishvas Patil
2005 Indian novels
Marathi novels